Dr. Williamson John Reynolds (b. 22 October 1861 d. 1922) was an English organist and composer.

Education

He was born on 22 October 1861 in Kentish Town, London. He was educated at Compton Place Road New College in Eastbourne, Sussex.

He graduated as Mus Bac in 1886 and Mus Doc in 1889.

Appointments

Organist of Barnet Parish Church, 
Organist of  St. Michael, Cornhill 1891–1900
Organist of St Martin in the Bull Ring Birmingham 1900–1920
Organist of the Church of the Holy Trinity, Stratford-upon-Avon 1920–1922

Compositions
Magnificat for soli, chorus, strings and organ
Festival Te Deum, for soli, eight-part chorus and orchestra
Crossing the Bar.
Allegretto pastorale for organ

References

1861 births
English organists
British male organists
English composers
Year of death missing
Musicians from London